Fort Gay is a town in Wayne County, West Virginia, United States, situated along the Tug Fork and Big Sandy rivers. The town adjoins Louisa, Kentucky. The population was 677 at the 2020 census.

History

The Fort Gay community traces back to 1789, when 11 people established a settlement at the junction of the Tug and Big Sandy rivers, across from what is now Louisa, Kentucky.  In 1875, it was chartered as Cassville; though it was simultaneously known as Fort Gay.  In 1932, the town's name was officially changed to Fort Gay.  There is no evidence as to why the name was changed, there are several prevalent theories: that either the railroad company or post office did not want two Cassvilles on the same route/state (there is another Cassville, West Virginia), or that a Civil War nurse named Gay became synonymous with the town.

Fort Gay is a part of the Huntington-Ashland, WV-KY-OH, Metropolitan Statistical Area. As of the 2000 census, the MSA had a population of 288,649.

The Norfolk Southern Railway's Kenova District goes through the western edge of town.

In 2010, Fort Gay hit the news when Microsoft suspended an Xbox Live account that belonged to a Fort Gay resident for writing "fort gay WV" as his location, as Microsoft has language policies that prohibit references to homosexuality. Microsoft customer service representatives refused to acknowledge that Fort Gay existed, and it took an appeal from Mayor David Thompson and media coverage for the issue to be corrected.

Geography
Fort Gay is located at  (38.117528, -82.594620).

Demographics

2010 census
As of the census of 2010, there were 705 people, 323 households, and 197 families living in the town. The racial makeup of the town was 96.6% White, 0.6% Native American, 0.3% Asian, 0.1% from other races, and 2.4% from two or more races. Hispanic or Latino of any race were 0.6% of the population.

There were 323 households, of which 27.2% had children under the age of 18 living with them, 43.0% were married couples living together, 14.2% had a female householder with no husband present, 3.7% had a male householder with no wife present, and 39.0% were non-families. 35.9% of all households were made up of individuals, and 14.6% had someone living alone who was 65 years of age or older. The average household size was 2.18 and the average family size was 2.79.

The median age in the town was 43.2 years. 19.7% of residents were under the age of 18; 7.8% were between the ages of 18 and 24; 25% were from 25 to 44; 29.6% were from 45 to 64; and 17.9% were 65 years of age or older. The gender makeup of the town was 46.1% male and 53.9% female.

2000 census
As of the census of 2000, there were 819 people, 345 households, and 240 families living in the town. The population density was 1,034.5 inhabitants per square mile (400.3/km2). There were 394 housing units at an average density of 497.7 per square mile (192.6/km2). The racial makeup of the town was 98.66% White, 0.49% Asian, and 0.85% from two or more races.

There were 345 households, out of which 33.3% had children under the age of 18 living with them, 46.1% were married couples living together, 18.3% had a female householder with no husband present, and 30.4% were non-families. 28.1% of all households were made up of individuals, and 13.6% had someone living alone who was 65 years of age or older. The average household size was 2.37 and the average family size was 2.90.

In the town, the population was spread out, with 24.7% under the age of 18, 12.7% from 18 to 24, 27.0% from 25 to 44, 21.7% from 45 to 64, and 13.9% who were 65 years of age or older. The median age was 35 years. For every 100 females there were 82.0 males. For every 100 females age 18 and over, there were 73.8 males.

The median income for a household in the town was $14,565, and the median income for a family was $20,882. Males had a median income of $29,063 versus $16,442 for females. The per capita income for the town was $9,125. About 33.9% of families and 37.3% of the population were below the poverty line, including 53.1% of those under age 18 and 19.4% of those age 65 or over.

References

Towns in Wayne County, West Virginia
Towns in West Virginia